The Australian Journal of Linguistics is a quarterly peer-reviewed academic journal in the field of linguistics established in 1981. It is the official journal of the Australian Linguistic Society and is published by Routledge. Its main focus is theoretical linguistics, as well as matters pertaining particularly to Australia such as Australian English and its indigenous languages. The current editors are Keith Allan and Jean Mulder.

External links 
 
Australian Linguistic Society

Publications established in 1981
English-language journals
Routledge academic journals
Linguistics journals
Quarterly journals
Australian culture